The ASE Market Capitalization Weighted Index is a stock index of the Amman Stock Exchange in Jordan.  The ASE Weighted Index is one of two principal stock indices on the exchange, the other being the ASE Unweighted Price Index.

The ASE Unweighted Index was created in 1980 and was very successful.  The ASE went on to create a weighted index in 1992.  The weighted index, whose constituents are listed below, attaches a value to each stock price based on the total market capitalisation of each stock; that is, the total amount of money the stock is worth on the stock market.  The Unweighted Index calculates an index value based on the price alone.

Index listings

Both the weighted and unweighted indices use the same list of stocks.  The constituents of the ASE indices are evaluated each year.  The 70 stocks listed here are the 2007 version of the index.  They are categorized by sector: banking sector, insurance sector, service sector and industrial sector.  The lists are alphabetized by stock symbol.

Banking sector

Insurance sector

Service sector

Industrial sector

External links
The Amman Stock Exchange; click "Market Information" to read about the ASE Market Capitalization Weighted Index

Finance in Jordan
Asian stock market indices